Rancho Murieta is a census-designated place (CDP) and guard-gated community in Sacramento County, California, United States. It is part of the Sacramento–Arden-Arcade–Roseville Metropolitan Statistical Area. The population was 5,488 at the 2010 census, up from 4,193 at the 2000 census.

Geography
The principal east–west access route is California State Highway 16, the Jackson Highway, which connects Rancho Murieta with the Sacramento metropolitan area, to its west and to Amador County and the world famous Shenandoah wine regions to the east.

Demographics

2010
The 2010 United States Census reported that Rancho Murieta had a population of 5,488. The racial makeup of Rancho Murieta was 4,874 (88.8%) White, 130 (2.4%) African American, 33 (0.6%) Native American, 158 (2.9%) Asian, 6 (0.1%) Pacific Islander, 81 (1.5%) from other races, and 206 (3.8%) from two or more races. Hispanic or Latino of any race were 425 persons (7.7%).

The Census reported that 5,488 people (100% of the population) lived in households, 0 (0%) lived in non-institutionalized group quarters, and 0 (0%) were institutionalized.

There were 2,301 households, out of which 617 (26.8%) had children under the age of 18 living in them, 1,589 (69.1%) were opposite-sex married couples living together, 126 (5.5%) had a female householder with no husband present, 57 (2.5%) had a male householder with no wife present.  There were 70 (3.0%) unmarried opposite-sex partnerships, and 15 (0.7%) same-sex married couples or partnerships. 454 households (19.7%) were made up of individuals, and 253 (11.0%) had someone living alone who was 65 years of age or older. The average household size was 2.39.  There were 1,772 families (77.0% of all households); the average family size was 2.72.

The population was spread out, with 1,135 people (20.7%) under the age of 18, 189 people (3.4%) aged 18 to 24, 981 people (17.9%) aged 25 to 44, 1,856 people (33.8%) aged 45 to 64, and 1,327 people (24.2%) who were 65 years of age or older.  The median age was 50.8 years. For every 100 females, there were 93.9 males.  For every 100 females age 18 and over, there were 91.9 males.

The homeowner vacancy rate was 2.7%; the rental vacancy rate was 6.0%.  4,836 people (88.1% of the population) lived in owner-occupied housing units and 652 people (11.9%) lived in rental housing units.

The median household income was $102,284

2000
As of the census of 2000, there were 4,193 people, 1,783 households, and 1,408 families residing in the CDP. The racial makeup of the CDP was 91.03% White, 1.93% African American, 0.36% Native American, 2.72% Asian, 0.07% Pacific Islander, 1.07% from other races, and 2.81% from two or more races. Hispanic or Latino of any race were 4.63% of the population.

There were 1,783 households, out of which 23.7% had children under the age of 18 living with them, 73.6% were married couples living together, 3.5% had a female householder with no husband present, and 21.0% were non-families. 17.9% of all households were made up of individuals, and 8.6% had someone living alone who was 65 years of age or older.  The average household size was 2.35 and the average family size was 2.64.

In the CDP, the population was spread out, with 18.8% under the age of 18, 2.6% from 18 to 24, 21.6% from 25 to 44, 35.0% from 45 to 64, and 21.9% who were 65 years of age or older.  The median age was 49 years. For every 100 females, there were 95.9 males.  For every 100 females age 18 and over, there were 92.6 males.

The median income for a household in the CDP was $82,130, and the median income for a family was $89,635. Males had a median income of $70,382 versus $36,923 for females. The per capita income for the CDP was $44,010.  About 1.8% of families and 2.0% of the population were below the poverty line, including 1.7% of those under age 18 and 1.5% of those age 65 or over.

Government

Local

Rancho Murieta is an unincorporated community within Sacramento County's 4th Supervisor District.  As of 2016, the elected Sacramento County Supervisor is Sue Frost.

Rancho Murieta is located 23 miles southeast of the State Capitol in southeast Sacramento County.  It is bisected by both the Cosumnes River and CA-16.

Rancho Murieta Community Services District was formed in 1982 by State Government Code 61000 to provide essential services in Rancho Murieta. Rancho Murieta CSD is an independent special district which provides the following services: water, sewer, drainage, flood control, security, solid waste collection and Parks and Recreation planning.

Rancho Murieta's governing bodies include a variety of homeowners associations: Rancho Murieta Association (RMA) provides Park and Recreation, street and common area maintenance and CC&R enforcement: Murieta Townhouses Inc. (MTI) maintains townhouses and provide insurance coverages for owners; The Villa Association (VA) streets and landscaping; Murieta Gardens Community Association (MGCA) and Rancho North Association (RNA) handles Design Review for the Retreats and 900 approved and prospective homes in the Rancho North Development.  The Rancho Murieta Commercial Owners Association handles street commercial maintenance south of Highway 16.
The Rancho Murieta Community Services District provides water, sewer, drainage, garbage, and security services for the community.

The RMA CC&R's limit motorcycle riding to within Rancho Murieta South.

State and Federal
In the state legislature Rancho Murieta is located in the 8th Senate District, represented by Republican Andreas Borgeas, and in the 8th Assembly District, represented by Democrat Ken Cooley.

The Rancho Murieta Airport is a designated reliever airport for general aviation in Sacramento County. The runway is 3800 ' long with a parallel taxiway and VASI approach with lighting system.  It is no longer home to the FAA Flight Service Station.

Rancho Murieta is home to the Joint Apprentice Training Center (JATC) for Operating Engineers International Union (Local #3).

Telephone prefixes
Telephone numbers for wired telephones working out of the Rancho Murieta central office follow the format (916) or (279) 354-xxxx and 314-xxxx.

References

External links

Census-designated places in Sacramento County, California
Gated communities in California
Census-designated places in California